Maisie Nankivell (born 29 September 1999)is a dual athlete, who plays netball for the Adelaide Thunderbirds in the Suncorp Super Netball and has played Australian rules football for the Adelaide Football Club in the AFL Women's (AFLW).

AFLW career
Nankivell was drafted by Adelaide as a rookie signing in 2018. She made her AFLW football debut in the one point loss to the Western Bulldogs at Norwood Oval in the opening round of the 2019 season. Following a full-time contract offer from Adelaide Thunderbirds, Nankivell withdrew from Adelaide's squad to focus full-time on netball and was placed on the inactive list. In August 2020, she retired from football.

Netball
In 2019, Nankivell was a training partner with the Adelaide Thunderbirds and was elevated into the team and debut against Collingwood in the wing defence position. Her performance saw her play a total of 7 games with the Thunderbirds and was then offered full-time contract with the Adelaide Thunderbirds for the following 2020 season.

References

External links 

1999 births
Living people
Adelaide Football Club (AFLW) players
Australian rules footballers from South Australia
Adelaide Thunderbirds players
Australian netball players
Australian Netball League players
Suncorp Super Netball players
Southern Force (netball) players
Netball players from South Australia
People educated at Immanuel College, Adelaide
South Australian Sports Institute netball players